The 1978 UAAP men's basketball tournament was the 41st year of the men's tournament of the University Athletic Association of the Philippines (UAAP)'s basketball championship. Hosted by National University, the UE Warriors defeated the defending champions Adamson Falcons in the finals taking their fifteenth overall UAAP men's basketball championship. Prior to the start of the season, Ateneo de Manila University was admitted as the seventh member school of the league.

References 

41
1978 in Philippine basketball